Giuseppe Delfino (22 November 1921 – 10 August 1999)  was an Italian fencer and Olympic champion in épée competition.

Biography
He won a gold medal in the épée individual event at the 1960 Summer Olympics in Rome. He won Olympic gold medals in the épée team events in 1952, 1956 and 1960, and silver in 1964.

See also
Italian athletes with most Olympic medals
Italian fencer multiple medallists at the Olympics
 Legends of Italian sport - Walk of Fame

References

External links
 

1921 births
1999 deaths
Sportspeople from Turin
Italian male fencers
Olympic fencers of Italy
Fencers at the 1952 Summer Olympics
Fencers at the 1956 Summer Olympics
Fencers at the 1960 Summer Olympics
Fencers at the 1964 Summer Olympics
Olympic gold medalists for Italy
Olympic silver medalists for Italy
Olympic medalists in fencing
Medalists at the 1952 Summer Olympics
Medalists at the 1956 Summer Olympics
Medalists at the 1960 Summer Olympics
Medalists at the 1964 Summer Olympics